Teddy Pendergrass is the debut solo album from the American R&B/soul singer Teddy Pendergrass, released in 1977.

It did well for a debut album, reaching #17 on the US Billboard 200 and #5 on the Billboard R&B album chart. Two singles were released: "I Don't Love You Anymore"; and "The Whole Town's Laughing at Me", reaching #41 pop & #5 R&B; and R&B #16, respectively.

Track listing
All tracks composed by Kenny Gamble and Leon Huff; except where indicated
 "You Can't Hide from Yourself" 4:08
 "Somebody Told Me" (Victor Carstarphen, Kenny Gamble, Gene McFadden, John Whitehead) 5:15
 "Be Sure" 5:19
 "And If I Had" 4:26
 "I Don't Love You Anymore" 4:01
 "The Whole Town's Laughing at Me" (Sherman Marshall, Ted Wortham) 4:30
 "Easy, Easy, Got to Take It Easy" (Victor Carstarphen, Gene McFadden, John Whitehead) 4:55
 "The More I Get, the More I Want" (Victor Carstarphen, Gene McFadden, John Whitehead) 4:26

Personnel
Teddy Pendergrass - vocals
Roland Chambers, Dennis Harris - guitar
Dexter Wansel, Victor Carstarphen, Ron Kersey - keyboards, synthesizers
Michael "Sugar Bear" Foreman, Jimmy Williams - bass
Keith Benson, Karl Chambers, Charles Collins - drums, percussion
Larry Washington - bongos, congas
MFSB - strings, horns
Bobby Martin, Jack Faith - arrangements
Technical
Ed Lee - album design, artwork
Frank Laffitte - photography

Charts

Weekly charts

Year-end charts

Singles

Later samples
"You Can't Hide from Yourself"
"Portrait of a Masterpiece" by The D.O.C. from the album No One Can Do It Better
"And If I Had"
"Devil's Pie" by D'Angelo from the album Voodoo
"Cradle to the Grave" by Mobb Deep from the album The Infamous
"Easy Easy Got to Take It Easy"
"Not Enough" by Little Brother from the album The Minstrel Show
"Somebody Told Me" **"Backtight" by Jaheim from the album "Still Ghetto"

References

External links
 Teddy Pendergrass-Teddy Pendergrass at Discogs

1977 debut albums
Teddy Pendergrass albums
Albums produced by Kenneth Gamble
Albums produced by Leon Huff
Albums arranged by Bobby Martin
Albums recorded at Sigma Sound Studios
Philadelphia International Records albums